Events in the year 1867 in Iceland.

Incumbents 

 Monarch: Christian IX
 Council President of Denmark: Christian Emil Krag-Juel-Vind-Frijs

Establishments 

 July 24 − Reykjavik Shooting Association, Iceland's oldest sport association is founded.

Births 

 February 14 − Þórarinn B. Þorláksson, painter.
 April 11 − Helgi Jónsson

References 

 
1860s in Iceland
Years of the 19th century in Iceland
Iceland
Iceland